Charles Bodle (July 1, 1788 – October 30, 1835) was an American politician who served one term as a U.S. Representative from New York from 1833 to 1835.

Biography
Charles Bodle was born near Poughkeepsie, New York on July 1, 1788.  He was a wagon maker by trade, and held several political offices in Bloomingburg, including Justice of the Peace.  From 1827 to 1833 he was Town Supervisor of Mamakating.

Congress 
Elected as a Jacksonian to the Twenty-third Congress, Bodle was the Representative of New York's 7th District, serving from March 4, 1833, to March 3, 1835.

Death
Bodle died in Bloomingburg on October 30, 1835.  He was interred at Bloomingburg Cemetery in Bloomingburg.

Family
Bodle was married to Esther Wood Bodle (1787-1848).  Their children included Catharine Sarah (1824-1833), Vashti (1821-1864), and William W. (b. 1817).

References

External links 

Charles Bodle at The Political Graveyard

Charles Bodle at Govtrack US Congress

1788 births
1835 deaths
Burials in New York (state)
Jacksonian members of the United States House of Representatives from New York (state)
Politicians from Poughkeepsie, New York
People from Sullivan County, New York
Town supervisors in New York (state)
19th-century American politicians
Members of the United States House of Representatives from New York (state)